Teleportation is the fictional or imagined process by which matter is instantaneously transferred from one place to another.

Teleportation may also refer to:

Quantum teleportation, a method of transmitting quantum data
Teleportation (virtualization), a method of moving a running virtual machine between two physical computers

See also
Teleport (disambiguation)